The Cape serotine (Laephotis capensis) is a species of vesper bat occurring in Sub-Saharan Africa. 'Serotine' is from Latin 'serotinus' meaning ‘of the evening'.

It is found in Angola, Benin, Botswana, Burundi, Cameroon, Central African Republic, Republic of the Congo, Democratic Republic of the Congo, Ivory Coast, Equatorial Guinea, Eritrea, Eswatini, Ethiopia, Gabon, Ghana, Guinea, Guinea-Bissau, Kenya, Lesotho, Liberia, Malawi, Mozambique, Namibia, Nigeria, Sierra Leone, Somalia, South Africa, Sudan, Tanzania, Togo, Uganda, Zambia, Zimbabwe, and possibly Djibouti.

Taxonomy 
It was formerly classified in Neoromicia before phylogenetic analysis found it to belong to Laephotis.

Habitat and ecology
Its natural habitats are subtropical or tropical dry forests, subtropical or tropical moist lowland forests, dry savanna, and moist savanna, grassland, bushveld and Acacia woodland, and though recorded from more arid areas is absent from desert regions.

Calum Moore discovered the animal in 1864

Animals roost in small groups of up to about 20 individuals, under the bark of trees, in hollow trees, in cracks in walls and under the eaves and roofs of houses whether thatched, tiled or covered in corrugated iron. Being unobtrusive, their presence is mostly unnoticed. They will readily occupy a bat house.

Small, brownish in colour with a greyish underbelly, and relatively untidy fur. Its colour is quite variable depending on the region where it occurs. Small snout and mouth, with a dome-shaped forehead. Wing membranes are dark in colour with a forearm length of some 29–38 mm with a small wingspan. Weight is between 4-10 grams. Its flying behaviour when foraging appears to be quite playful.
 
They give birth once a year to from 1-4 young between October and November. Food items include beetles, lacewings, moths, mosquitoes, plant-sucking bugs and a variety of other flying insects.

The genome of a close relative of human Middle East respiratory syndrome coronavirus has been found in a specimen of Laephotis capensis (previously erroneously assumed to be Neoromicia zuluensis).

Synonyms
Eptesicus capensis 
Vespertilio capensis 
Pipistrellus capensis in part
Neoromicia capensis

References

Laephotis
Taxonomy articles created by Polbot
Mammals described in 1829
Fauna of South Africa
Taxobox binomials not recognized by IUCN